Minnesota Rokkr (stylized as Minnesota RØKKR) is an American professional Call of Duty League (CDL) esports team based in Minneapolis, Minnesota. ROKKR is owned by WISE Ventures, a private investments fund owned by the Wilf family, the owners of the Minnesota Vikings, along with Gary Vaynerchuk, who takes an active role in representing the team.

History 
On July 1, 2019, Minnesota was announced as one of the twelve cities owning a spot in the CDL. On October 29, 2019, Minnesota announced their branding as Minnesota ROKKR; Brett Diamond, COO of WISE Ventures, explained they were going for a Norse mythology theme. In Old Norse dialect, røkkr translates to twilight, and can also be linked to Ragnarök.

During the 2020 Call of Duty League season the team failed to win any Home Series, resulting in an 8th finish in the Regular Season standings. At the Champions Weekend the team finished 9th/10th following a loss to the New York Subliners in the Winners Bracket round 1, followed by a loss against OpTic Gaming Los Angeles in the Losers Bracket round 2.

In September 2020 the Minnesota ROKKR were joined by Priestahh, MajorManiak, Attach and Accuracy.

On August 1st, 2021, Minnesota ROKKR won their first Major in franchise history after being down 0–4 against Toronto Ultra during the Stage 5 major finals.

In September 2021 the Minnesota ROKKR revealed that Priestahh, MajorManiak, Attach and Standy would return as the roster for the 2022 CDL season.

Current roster

References

External links
 

Venture capital-funded esports teams
Esports teams based in the United States
Call of Duty League teams
Esports teams established in 2019